Adrian Stoicov (12 November 1967 – 15 March 2017) was a Romanian footballer who played as a left-back. After he ended his playing career he worked as an assistant and youth coach. He died aged 49 after suffering from lung cancer.

Honours
Politehnica Timișoara
 Divizia B: 1988–89, 1994–95
 Cupa României: Runner-up 1991–92 
UM Timişoara
 Divizia C: 1998–99

Notes

References

External links

1967 births
2017 deaths
Romanian footballers
Association football defenders
Liga I players
Liga II players
FC Politehnica Timișoara players
FC Progresul București players
FC CFR Timișoara players
CSM Deva players
Deaths from lung cancer
Deaths from cancer in Romania
People from Timiș County